Disney's Grand Californian Hotel & Spa is a hotel located at the Disneyland Resort in Anaheim, California. The hotel was constructed as part of a major expansion of the Disneyland Resort in 2001. It was constructed and operated by The Walt Disney Company. The hotel was designed in the American Craftsman style of architecture. It also features a Disney Vacation Club wing that opened on September 23, 2009. The hotel has a private entrance to Disney California Adventure Park. In 2017, Disney remodeled the rooms, along with the lobby.

Description 
The hotel was designed by architect Peter Dominick of 4240 Architecture Inc. (formerly part of Urban Design Group Inc.). It has 948 rooms, in addition to 44 suites and 71 villas.

Craftsman style buildings often use garden themes, which was Peter Dominick's inspiration for the hotel's forest theme. The reception hall is based on the interior of the Swedenborgian Church in San Francisco, increased in scale to accommodate the large reception desk. The central lobby is a living room with a large fireplace, vast arching beams overhead, and furnished with chairs and sofas arranged around small coffee tables.

Many of the items found throughout the hotel have been crafted by modern practitioners of the Arts and Crafts style, and some early Roycroft items are on display in the lobby.

Some of the hotel's rooms are tributes to various Craftsman-era architects and designers such as Frank Lloyd Wright, Charles Rennie MacKintosh, and the Gladding, McBean Company.

Its name is based on Disney's Grand Floridian Resort & Spa, its sister resort and Walt Disney World's flagship resort hotel. The two hotels do not share themes, though, as the Grand Californian is a Craftsman theme, while the Grand Floridian is of a Victorian theme. It does, however, share many thematic elements with Disney's Wilderness Lodge (also designed by Dominick) with its national park lodge theming at Walt Disney World.

History 
The hotel opened on January 2, 2001 as a part of the parks expansion at the Disney Land Resort.

At about 3:00 am on December 28, 2005, a Christmas tree in the main lobby caught fire after electric maintenance workers replaced lights on the tree. All 2,300 guests at the hotel were evacuated within four minutes. The fire was contained by the hotel's sprinkler system and by the Anaheim Fire Department. Two guests were treated for minor injuries, one of which was a severe headache. Guests were returned to their rooms by 7:00 am.

In response to a growing demand for guest accommodations in Anaheim, the Disneyland Resort announced on September 18, 2007, an expansion of Disney's Grand Californian Hotel & Spa that would increase accommodations by more than 30 percent and include the first Disney Vacation Club villas in Anaheim.

The  expansion on the hotel's south side added more than 200 hotel rooms and 50 two-bedroom equivalent vacation villas and marked the West Coast debut of Disney Vacation Club, Disney's vacation ownership program. During this expansion and renovation, a swimming pool was added as well as a 300 space underground parking garage. Peter Dominick designed the ambitious expansion to complement his existing hotel. It reflects the same California Arts & Crafts architecture of the existing hotel, which immerses guests in a turn-of-the-20th-century California experience. The project was completed in September 2009.

With the completion of this major expansion, Disney's Grand Californian Hotel & Spa became the fourth-largest hotel in Orange County.

The Villas at Disney's Grand Californian Hotel 
The Disney Vacation Club villas, added as part of the hotel's expansion, include kitchens, living and dining areas and other home-like amenities. The guest rooms feature the same decor as the hotel rooms in the original structure and continue the Californian Craftsman motif.

Napa Rose 
Napa Rose is a restaurant in Disney's Grand Californian Hotel & Spa at the Disneyland Resort in Anaheim, California, that opened in 2001 as part of Disney's expansion of its Anaheim property from one theme park (Disneyland) into a multi-park resort complex. It specializes in California cuisine and has a Napa Valley wine theme. The restaurant's design is inspired by Scottish art nouveau designer Charles Rennie Mackintosh.

Napa Rose's head chef, Andrew Sutton, formerly of the Rosewood Mansion on Turtle Creek's restaurant in Dallas, was hired from Auberge du Soleil in Napa Valley, and former general manager and sommelier Michael Jordan  was hired from the Patina Restaurant Group. Disney hired Sutton and Jordan in order to raise the credibility of its food and wine program. The restaurant has won multiple awards from different organizations, such as the Wine Spectator, Zagat, The Southern California Restaurant Writers and the Orange County Business Journal.

Craftsman Bar & Grill 
Craftsman Bar & Grill, formerly known as White Water Snacks, is the refurbished quick service restaurant located in Disney's Grand Californian Hotel & Spa at the Disneyland Resort in Anaheim. Initially opened in 2001 with the hotel, it re-opened in 2019 under this new name with an expanded pool deck and revised menu.

Gallery

References

Books 
 Winter, Robert; Vertikoff, Alexander (2004). Craftsman Style, pp 227–233. New York: Harry N. Abrams, Inc. .

External links 

Disneyland Resort – Grand Californian Hotel & Spa, Design Inspirations from the Architect

Hotels in Disneyland Resort
Restaurants in Orange County, California
Buildings and structures in Anaheim, California
Tourist attractions in Anaheim, California
Arts and Crafts architecture in California
American Craftsman architecture in California
Hotel buildings completed in 2001
Hotels established in 2001
Disney California Adventure